Caron is a small town located on the Mullewa-Wubin Road in the Mid West region of Western Australia. It is situated between the towns of Perenjori and Dalwallinu.

Originating as a railway station along the Wongan to Mullewa line, the townsite was gazetted in 1921.

The name is Aboriginal in origin, being a word for hail or hailstone.
 
The heritage-listed Caron Coal Stage, built in the golden age of steam locomotives, and the associated railway dam are located close to the town. The stage is a simple example of an elevated concrete coal bin, constructed in 1930 or 1931 to provide fuel to the trains of the era, and is the only remaining trace of the Caron siding.

References 

Shire of Perenjori